Shimla (also known as Simla, the official name until 1972) is the capital and the largest city of the northern Indian state of Himachal Pradesh. In 1864, Shimla was declared as the summer capital of British India. After independence, the city became the capital of East Punjab and was later made the capital city of Himachal Pradesh. It is the principal commercial, cultural and educational centre of the state.

Small hamlets were recorded before 1815 when British forces took control of the area. The climatic conditions attracted the British to establish the city in the dense forests of the Himalayas. As the summer capital, Shimla hosted many important political meetings including the Simla Accord of 1914 and the Simla Conference of 1945. After independence, the state of Himachal Pradesh came into being in 1948 as a result of the integration of 28 princely states. Even after independence, the city remained an important political centre, hosting the Simla Agreement of 1972. After the reorganisation of the state of Himachal Pradesh, the existing Mahasu district was named Shimla.

Shimla is home to several buildings that are styled in the Tudorbethan and neo-Gothic architectures dating from the colonial era, as well as multiple temples and churches. The colonial architecture and churches, the temples, and the natural environment of the city attract tourists. Major city centre's attractions include the Shri Hanuman Jakhu (Statue), Jakhu Temple, Viceregal Lodge, Christ Church, Mall Road, The Ridge and Annadale. The city centre's northernmost point is Jakhoo and the southernmost location is Annadale, the easternmost point is Sanjauli and the western point is Chotta Shimla. The Kalka–Shimla Railway line built by the British, a UNESCO World Heritage Site, is also a major tourist attraction. Owing to its steep terrain, Shimla hosts the mountain biking race MTB Himalaya, which started in 2005 and is regarded as the biggest event of its kind in South Asia. Shimla also has the largest natural ice skating rink in South Asia. Apart from being a tourism centre, the city is also an educational hub with several colleges and research institutions.

Etymology 
Shimla city gets its name from Shyamala Mata, a fearless incarnation of the goddess Kali. The temple of the goddess is situated on Bantony Hill, near The Ridge, named Kali Bari temple. According to another version Shimla gets its name from the word 'Shyamalaya' meaning blue slate by faqir on Jakhu. But generally, society finds the first version more believable, acceptable and reasonable.

In 2018, the state government decided to change the city's name from Shimla to Shyamala. However, seeing the negative response of public and the locals, state government dismissed the plan.

History
Most of the area occupied by present-day Shimla city was dense forest during the 18th century. The only sign of civilisation was the Jakhu Temple and a few scattered houses. The area was called 'Shimla', named after a Hindu goddess, Shyamala Devi, an incarnation of Kali.

The area of present-day Shimla was invaded and captured by Bhimsen Thapa of Nepal in 1806. The British East India Company took control of the territory as per the Sugauli Treaty after the Anglo-Nepalese War (1814–16). The Gurkha leaders were quelled by storming the fort of Malaun under the command of David Ochterlony in May 1815. In a diary entry dated 30 August 1817, the Gerard brothers, who surveyed the area, describe Shimla as "a middling-sized village where a fakir is situated to give water to the travellers". In 1819, Lieutenant Ross, the Assistant Political Agent in the Hill States, set up a wood cottage in Shimla. Three years later, his successor and the Scottish civil servant Charles Pratt Kennedy built the first pucca house in the area named Kennedy Cottage in 1822, near Annadale, what is now the home for CPWD office. The accounts of the Britain-like climate started attracting several British officers to the area during the hot Indian summers. By 1826, some officers had started spending their entire vacation in Shimla. In 1827, William Amherst, the Governor-General of Bengal, visited Shimla and stayed in the Kennedy House. A year later, Stapleton Cotton, the Commander-in-Chief of the British forces in India, stayed at the same residence. During his stay, a three-mile road and a bridge were constructed near Jakhoo. In 1830, the British acquired the surrounding land from the chiefs of Keonthal and Patiala in exchange for the Rawin pargana and a portion of the Bharauli pargana. The settlement grew rapidly after this, from 30 houses in 1830 to 1,141 houses in 1881.

In 1832, Shimla saw its first political meeting: between the Governor-General Lord William Bentinck and the emissaries of Maharaja Ranjit Singh. In a letter to Colonel Churchill, he wrote:

Combermere's successor Earl Dalhousie visited Shimla in the same year. After this, the town was under Nawab (King) Kumar Ghosal of Bally, West Bengal, and saw regular visits from the Governors-General and Commanders-in-Chief of British India. Several young British officers started visiting the area to socialise with the higher-ups; they were followed by ladies looking for marriage alliances for their relatives. Shimla thus became a hill station famous for balls, parties, and other festivities. Subsequently, residential schools for pupils from upper-class families were established nearby. By the late 1830s, the city also became a centre for theatre and art exhibitions. As the population increased, several bungalows were built and a big bazaar was established in the town. The Indian businessmen, mainly from Sood and Parsi communities, arrived in the area to cater to the needs of the growing European population. On 9 September 1844, the foundation of the Christ Church was laid. Subsequently, several roads were widened and the construction of the Hindustan-Tibet road with a 560-feet tunnel was taken up in 1851–52. This tunnel, now known as the Dhalli Tunnel, was started by Major Briggs in 1850 and completed in the winter of 1851–52. The 1857 uprising caused a panic among the European residents of the town, but Shimla remained largely unaffected by the rebellion.

In 1863, the Viceroy of India, John Lawrence, decided to shift the summer capital of the British Raj to Shimla. He took the trouble of moving the administration twice a year between Calcutta and this separate centre over 1,000 miles away, even though it was difficult to reach. Robert Bulwer-Lytton (Viceroy of India 1876–1880) made efforts to plan the town from 1876, when he first stayed in a rented house, but began plans for a Viceregal Lodge, later built on Observatory Hill. A fire cleared much of the area where the native Indian population lived (the "Upper Bazaar" nowadays known as the Ridge), and the planning of the eastern end to become the centre of the European town forced them to live in the Middle and Lower Bazaars on the lower terraces descending the steep slopes from the Ridge. The Upper Bazaar was cleared for a town hall, with many facilities such as a library and theatre, as well as offices for police and military volunteers as well as municipal administration.

During the "Hot Weather", Shimla was also the headquarters of the Commander-in-Chief, India, the head of the Indian Army, and many departments of the government. The summer capital of the regional Government of the Punjab moved from Murree, in modern-day Pakistan, to Shimla in 1876. They were joined by many of the British wives and daughters of the men who remained on the plains. Together these formed the Shimla Society, which, according to Charles Allen, "was as close as British India ever came to having an upper crust." This may have been helped by the fact that it was very expensive, having an ideal climate and thus being desirable, as well as having limited accommodation. British soldiers, merchants, and civil servants moved here each year to escape from the heat during summer in the Indo-Gangetic plain. The presence of many bachelors and unattached men, as well as the many women passing the hot weather there, gave Shimla a reputation for adultery, and at least gossip about adultery: as Rudyard Kipling said in a letter cited by Allen, it had a reputation for "frivolity, gossip, and intrigue".

The  Lower Bazaar tunnel was built in 1905 and christened Khachhar Surang.

The Simla Convention, an ambiguous treaty concerning the status of Tibet negotiated by representatives of the Republic of China, Tibet and Great Britain was signed in Simla in 1913 and 1914. At the convention a demarcation line between Tibet and the North-east region of India was proposed by Sir Henry McMahon. The line came to be known as McMahon Line and is currently the effective boundary between China and India, although its legal status is disputed by the Chinese government. This was also the site of a series of talks held by Viceroy Wavell to discuss a plan for the independence of India with the Indian political leaders of the time. Known as the Simla Conference, the talks failed to bring about a resolution.

Shimla was the capital city in exile of British Burma (present-day Myanmar) from 1942 to 1945.

The Kalka–Shimla railway line, opened in 1903, added to Shimla's accessibility and popularity. The railway route from Kalka to Shimla, with more than 806 bridges and 103 tunnels, was touted as an engineering feat and came to be known as the "British Jewel of the Orient". In 2008, it became part of the UNESCO World Heritage Site. Following the partition of India, it briefly served as the capital of East Punjab, until construction of the new city of Chandigarh (the present-day capital of the Indian states of Punjab and Haryana). Upon the formation of the state of Himachal Pradesh in 1971, Shimla was named its capital.

After independence, the Chief Commissioner's Province of H.P. came into being on 15 April 1948 as a result of the integration of 28 petty princely states (including feudatory princes and zaildars) in the promontories of the western Himalaya, known in full as the Shimla Hills States and four Punjab southern hill states by the issue of the Himachal Pradesh (Administration) Order, 1948 under Sections 3 and 4 of the Extra-Provincial Jurisdiction Act, 1947 (later renamed as the Foreign Jurisdiction Act, 1947 vide A.O. of 1950). The State of Bilaspur was merged into the Himachal Pradesh on 1 April 1954 by the Himachal Pradesh and Bilaspur (New State) Act, 1954. Himachal became a part C state on 26 January 1950 with the implementation of the Constitution of India and the Lt. Governor was appointed. The legislative assembly was elected in 1952. Himachal Pradesh became a Union Territory on 1 November 1956. Following areas of Punjab State namely Shimla, Kangra, Kulu and Lahul and Spiti Districts, Nalagarh tehsil of Ambala District, Lohara, Amb and Una kanungo circles, some areas of Santokhgarh kanungo circle and some other specified area of Una tehsil of Hoshiarpur District besides some parts of Dhar Kalan Tehsil of Pathankot district; were merged with Himachal Pradesh on 1 November 1966 on the enactment of Punjab Reorganisation Act, 1966 by the Parliament. On 18 December 1970, the State of Himachal Pradesh Act was passed by Parliament and the new state came into being on 25 January 1971. Thus Himachal emerged as the eighteenth state of the Indian Union.

The Simla Agreement treaty was signed in Shimla by Zulfiqar Ali Bhutto, the President of Pakistan, and Indira Gandhi, the Prime Minister of India. The agreement paved the way for diplomatic recognition of Bangladesh by Pakistan. Technically the document was signed at 0040 hours on the night of 3 July; despite this official documents are dated 2 July 1972.

Pre-independence structures still dot Shimla; buildings such as the former Viceregal Lodge, Assembly Chamber, Auckland House, Christ Church, Gorton Castle, Shimla Town Hall and the Gaiety Theatre are reminders of British rule in India. The original Peterhoff, another Viceregal residence, burned down in 1981. British Shimla extended about a mile and a half along the ridge between Jakhoo Hill and Prospect Hill. The central spine was the Mall Road, which ran along the length of the Ridge, with a Mall Extension southwards, closed to all carriages except those of the viceroy and his wife.

Geography

The city is a Zone IV (High Damage Risk Zone) per the Earthquake hazard zoning of India. Weak construction techniques and an increasing population pose a serious threat to the already earthquake prone region. Other rivers that flow through the Shimla district, although further from the city, are the Giri, and Pabbar (both tributaries of Yamuna).

The main forests in and around the city are of Pine, Deodar, Oak and Rhododendron. Environmental degradation due to the increasing number of tourists every year without the infrastructure to support them has resulted in Shimla losing its popular appeal as an ecotourism spot. Another rising concern in the region are the frequent number of landslides that often take place after heavy rains.

The city is situated 88 km (55 miles) northeast of Kalka, 116 km (72 miles) northeast of Chandigarh, 247 km (154 miles) south of Manali and 350 km (219 miles) northeast of Delhi, the national capital. Kalka can be reached within 2.5 hours, and Chandigarh can be reached in 3 hours and 15 minutes. Delhi and Manali are both around 7 hours away from Shimla.

To the east of Shimla stand the Choor Mountains (Chuor, 3647m). A passage over these mountains, from the Tons River to Shimla is described in Views in India, chiefly among the Himalaya Mountains, by George Francis White with accompanying drawings, Village of Khandoo, on the Ascent to the Choor, and two that were subsequently the subject of poetical illustrations by Letitia Elizabeth Landon, namely Crossing the Choor Mountains, and Village of Koghera and Deodar Forest, near the Choor

The accompanying notes record that "During a considerable part of the year, the Choor is hoary with snow; and when moonlight falls upon the scene, an effect is produced as if floods of molten silver were poured over the surface. Moonlight in these regions assumes a novel charm."

Seven Hills of Shimla 

Shimla was built on top of seven hills: Inverarm Hill, Observatory Hill, Prospect Hill, Summer Hill, Bantony Hill, Elysium Hill and Jakhu Hill. In recent times the city has spread past the initial seven hills.

Climate

Shimla features a subtropical highland climate (Cwb) under the Köppen climate classification. The climate in Shimla is predominantly cool during winters and moderately warm during summer.

Snowfall in the region, which historically has taken place in December, has lately (over the last fifteen years) been happening in January or early February every year.

On two consecutive days (17 and 18 January 2013), the town received  of snow.

Economy 
Employment is largely driven by the government and tourism sectors. Education sector and horticultural produce processing comprise most of the remainder. Recently a Model Career Centre has been set-up at Regional Employment Exchange, Shimla to enable bridging the gap between job-seekers and employers.

In addition to being the local hub of transport and trade, Shimla is the area's healthcare centre, hosting a medical college and four major hospitals: Indira Gandhi Hospital (Snowdown Hospital,) Deen Dayal Upadhyay Hospital (formerly called Ripon Hospital), Kamla Nehru Hospital and Indus Hospital. The city's development plan aims to make Shimla an attractive health tourism spot. Major departmental headquarters of the state are also located in Shimla such as Himachal Pradesh Government Printing and Stationery Press, Himachal Pradesh State Electricity Board, and Himachal Pradesh Police Headquarters.

The hotel industry is one of the major sources of income generation for the city. Shimla has up to 6500 hotels, including 5-star hotels, most popular is Oberoi Cecil, Peterhoff, Wildflower Hall and Hotel Holiday Home. Shimla leads the list of Indian cities with the highest-ranked hotels.

Along with schools of higher education, several institutes are also present, namely Himachal Pradesh University and Indian Institute of Advanced Study. Recruitment to the IAAS is through the joint competitive examinations (the Civil Services Examination) and promotion from the subordinate cadre. Once recruited to IAAS, the directly recruited officers are trained mainly at the National Academy of Audit and Accounts, Shimla. Students from across India prefer to study in Shimla because of its climate and Queen of Hill Stations status. These have added to the economy of the district as well as the state.

The government is trying to promote the technology and IT sector as the new area for growth and promotion although not many companies have yet settled in Shimla. There are many new startups in and around Shimla. There are over six call centres in Shimla.

Civic administration

The administrative responsibilities of the city of Shimla and merged areas of Dhalli, Totu, and New Shimla reside with the Shimla Municipal Corporation (SMC). All three areas were taken under SMC in 2006–07. Established in 1851, the Shimla Municipal Corporation is an elected body comprising 41 councillors, three of whom are nominated by the government of Himachal Pradesh. The nominations are based on prominence in the fields of social service, academics, and other activities. Thirty-three per cent of the seats are reserved for women. The elections take place every five years and the mayor and deputy mayor are elected by and amongst the councillors themselves.

The administrative head of the corporation is the Commissioner who is appointed by the state government.

The two major political parties are the Bharatiya Janata Party and Indian National Congress with a third party, Communist Party of India (Marxist), emerging.

The city contributes one seat to the state assembly (Vidhan Sabha) and one seat to the lower house of parliament (Lok Sabha). Law and order in the city is collectively maintained by the Police Force, Vigilance Department, enforcement directorate, forensics, fire brigade, prisons service and Home Guard. There are five police stations and three fire stations in Shimla. The Superintendent of Police, Shimla heads the police force. The First Armed Police Battalion, one of the four armed police battalions in the state, is available for assistance to the local police.

There are eleven courts in the district including a fast-track court.

Demographics

Population
According to 2011 census, Shimla city spread over an area of 35.34 km2 had a population of 169,578 with 93,152 males and 76,426 females. Shimla urban agglomeration had a population of 171,817 as per provisional data of 2011 census, out of which males were 94,797 and females were 77,020. The effective literacy rate of city was 93.63 percent and that of urban agglomeration was 94.14 per cent.

The city area has increased considerably along with time. It has stretched from Hiranagar to Dhalli from one side & Tara Devi to Malyana in the other. As per the 2001 India Census, the city has a population of 142,161 spread over an area of 19.55 km2. A floating population of 75,000 is attributed to service industries such as tourism. The largest demographic, 55%, is 16–45 years of age. A further 28% of the population is younger than 15 years. The low sex ratio – 930 girls for every 1,000 boys in 2001 – is cause for concern, and much lower than the 974 versus 1,000 for Himachal Pradesh state as a whole.

The unemployment rate in the city has come down from 36% in 1992 to 22.6% in 2006. This drop is attributed to recent industrialisation, the growth of service industries, and knowledge development.

Language
Hindi is the lingua franca of the city, it is the principal spoken language of the city and also the most commonly used language for official purposes. English is also spoken by a sizeable population and is the second official language of the city. Other than Hindi, Pahari languages are spoken by the ethnic Pahari people, who form a major part of the population in the city. Punjabi language is prevalent among the ethnic Punjabi migrant population of the city, most of whom are refugees from West Punjab, who settled in the city after the Partition of India in 1947.

Religion

According to 2011 census, the majority religion of the city is Hinduism practised by 93.5% of the population, followed by Islam (2.29%), Sikhism (1.95%), Buddhism (1.33%), Christianity (0.62%), and Jainism (0.10%).

Culture
The people of Shimla are informally called Shimlaites. With largely cosmopolitan crowds, a variety of festivals are celebrated here. The Shimla Summer Festival, held every year during peak tourist season, and lasting 3–4 days, is celebrated on the Ridge. The highlights of this event include performances by popular singers from all over the country. Since 2015, 95.0 BIG FM and Himachal Tourism have been jointly organising a seven-day long winter carnival on the Ridge from Christmas to New Year's.

Shimla has several places to visit. Local hangouts like the Mall and the Ridge area in the heart of the city. Most of the heritage buildings in the city are preserved in their original 'Tudorbethan' architecture. The former Viceregal Lodge, which now houses the Indian Institute of Advanced Study, and Wildflower Hall, now a luxury hotel, are some of the famous ones. A collection of paintings, jewellery, and textiles of the region can be found at the State Museum (built-in 1974).

Lakkar Bazaar, a market extending off the Ridge, sells souvenirs and crafts made of wood. Tatta Pani,  from the main city, is the name of hot sulphur springs that are believed to have medicinal value located on the banks of the River Satluj. Shimla is also home to South Asia's only natural ice skating rink. State and national level competitions are often held at this venue. Shimla Ice Skating Club, which manages the rink, hosts a carnival every year in January, which includes a fancy dress competition and figures skating events. Due to the effects of global warming and increasing urban development in and around Shimla, the number of sessions on the ice every winter has been decreasing in the past few years.

Shimla has many temples and is often visited by devotees from nearby towns and cities. The Kali Bari temple, dedicated to the Hindu goddess Kali is near the mall. Jakhoo Temple, for the Hindu god Hanuman, is located at the highest point in Shimla. Sankat Mochan, another Hanuman temple, is famous for the numerous monkeys that are always found in its vicinity. The nearby temple of Tara Devi is a place for performing rituals and festivals. Other prominent places of worship include a Gurudwara near the bus terminus and Christ Church on the Ridge.

Shimla arts and crafts are highly in demand by tourists. They range from excellent pieces of jewellery, embroidered shawls and garments to leather made articles and sculptures. Shimla is full of pine and deodar trees. The wood has been extensively used in all major buildings of Shimla. The various kinds of crafts of Shimla made out of wood include small boxes, utensils, image carvings, and souvenirs.

The carpet-making of Shimla is a great attraction for tourists. Different floral and other motifs are used. Wool is used to making blankets and rugs. The embroidery includes handkerchiefs, hand fans, gloves, and caps.

The shawls of Shimla are very well known for their fine quality. The leathercraft of Shimla comprises shoes, slippers, and belts. The other arts and crafts of Shimla include a huge collection of beaded and metal jewellery.

The culture of Shimla throwbacks religious, agnostic Kumauni people with a simple lifestyle living away from the hustle and bustle of metro cities.

Shimla has the largest natural ice skating rink in South Asia. The ice skating season usually begins at the start of December and goes on until the end of February. The city has sporting venues like the Indira Gandhi Rajya Khel Parisar, the main sports complex, a golf course at Annadale and further out from the city is another nine-hole golf course at  Naldehra, the oldest of its kind in India.
Shimla is also part of the wider Western Pahari cultural belt which extends until Murree, Pakistan.

Education

The city has 13 anganwadis and 64 primary schools. There are many schools from the British era. Some of the popular convent schools in the city are Bishop Cotton School, Convent of Jesus and Mary (Chelsea), St. Edward's School, Auckland House School, Loreto Convent (Tara Hall). Bishop Cotton School and St. Edward's School, Shimla are for boys only, whereas, Loreto Convent, Tara Hall and Convent of Jesus and Mary, Chelsea is for girls only. Other public schools include DAV Public School New Shimla, Shimla Public School, Himalayan International School and S.D. Senior Secondary School.

The medical institutes in Shimla include Indira Gandhi Medical College and St. Bede's, a girls-only college. Government College, Sanjauli is also located in the city. The Indian Institute of Advanced Study, housed in the Viceregal Lodge, is a residential centre for research in Humanities, Indian culture, religion, and social and natural sciences. The Himachal Pradesh University (state university of Himachal Pradesh) is also located in Shimla. Himachal Pradesh University Business School (HPUBS) and University Institute of Information Technology, Himachal Pradesh University (UIIT), a premier technical education institute, Himachal Pradesh National Law University, Shimla are also located here.

There is one private university, APG (Alakh Prakash Goyal) Shimla University. It was named the Best University in Hills by Assocham India.

Shimla has two state libraries with a collection of over 47,000 old books divided between them. The one at Gandhi Bhavan in the university has over 40,000 books and the other library, also a heritage building on the ridge has 7,000.

Other institutes of higher education and research located in Shimla are the Central Potato Research Institute, a member of Indian Council of Agricultural Research (ICAR) and the National Academy of Audit and Accounts for the training of officers of the Indian Audits and Accounts Service (IA&AS).

Places of interest

The Mall is the main shopping street of Shimla. It has many restaurants, clubs, banks, bars, post offices, and tourist offices. The lower part of Gaiety Theatre lies here.
The Ridge is a large open space, which is situated alongside the Mall Road and hosts all the cultural activities in the city. Christ Church situated on the Ridge, is the second oldest church in Northern India. Inside there are stained glass windows that represent faith, hope, charity, fortitude, patience, and humility. There are State Library and Gaiety Heritage Cultural Complex too which are some of the notable buildings located here.
Jakhoo - Jakhoo temple is 2 km from The Ridge, at a height of 8,000 ft, Jakhoo Hill is the highest peak in the city and has views of the city and the snow-covered Himalayas. At the top of the hill is an old temple of Hanuman, a Hindu deity which is popular among tourists and locals alike. A 108 feet (33-metre) statue of Hanuman, at 8,500 feet (2,591 metres) above sea level, is the statue standing at the highest altitude among several other masterpieces in the world, overtaking the Christ Redeemer in Rio de Janeiro, Brazil. Jakhoo has ropeway also which connects Jakhoo temple to the ridge ground and is the first ropeway in Shimla.
Kali Bari is a temple dedicated to Goddess Kali's fearless incarnation Shyamala on which Shimla city is named. The extensive views from the temple include such sights as Annadale, Shima Railway Station, Railway Board Building, Old Bus Stand, ARTRAC, TV Tower, etc.
Annadale  was developed as the racecourse of Shimla, Annadale is 2–4 km from the Ridge at a height of 6,117 ft. It is now used by the Indian Army. It has the Army Heritage Museum which is a notable tourist destination on its own, and also a golf course and a helipad are situated here. Every VVIP, VIP, or celebrity who visits Shimla comes by Annadale helipad. Annadale is one of the prime tourist sites of Shimla. The first Durand Cup Football Tournament was organised here in 1888 by Mortimer Durand.
Indian Institute of Advanced Studies is an educational institute now. This institute is housed at the former Viceregal Lodge, built-in 1884–88.
Himachal Pradesh State Museum - Himachal Pradesh State Museum was opened in 1974, and has tried to protect the hill-out and the cultural wealth of the state. There is a collection of miniature Pahari paintings, sculptures, bronzes wood-carvings and also costumes, textiles, and jewellery of the region.
Summer Hill is at a height of 6,500  ft on the Shimla-Kalka railway line. Mahatma Gandhi lived in these quiet surroundings during his visits to Shimla. Himachal Pradesh University is situated here.
Sankat Mochan Temple is a Hindu temple dedicated to Hanuman. It is situated on the Shimla-Chandigarh highway.
Tara Devi Temple - Tara Devi Temple is 11 km from the Shimla bus-stand. Tara Devi hill has a temple dedicated to the goddess of stars on top of the hill. There is a military Dairy Town here as well as the headquarters of Bharat Scouts and Guides.
Sanjauli is the main suburb of Shimla.
Dhingu Mata Temple is situated atop a hill in Sanjauli. It is the second-highest hilltop temple in Shimla after Jakhoo temple.
Kamna Devi Temple is situated on top of Prospect Hill in Baileuganj.
Chadwick Falls
Kufri is situated near Shimla. Kufri sees the annual sports winter festival in February. Adventure activities like skiing and tobogganing. 
 Himalayan Nature Park is situated just outside the city. 
Chharabra is near Kufri. It is famous for its natural beauty and Kalyani helipad.
Mashobra is near Shimla. Craignano Park here is a popular spot.
Jutogh is located 8 km from Shimla city centre,  this is an army cantonment, it is near Totu, an important suburb of Shimla city.

Transport

Local transport in Shimla is by bus or private vehicles. Buses ply frequently on the circular road surrounding the city centre. Like any other growing city, Shimla is also expanding with new habitats in the vicinity. Transport services in these areas are also expanding rapidly. Tourist taxis are also an option for out of town trips. Locals typically traverse the city on foot. Private vehicles are prohibited at the Mall, Ridge, and nearby markets. Due to narrow roads and steep slopes, the auto rickshaws which are common in other Indian cities are largely absent.

Road
Shimla is well-connected by road network to all major cities in north India and all major towns and district headquarters within the state. National Highway 5 (formerly NH 22) connects Shimla to the nearest big city of Chandigarh. This road is being upgraded by four-laning as part of the Shimla-Chandigarh Expressway project, and has been completed until Solan as of July 2021.

Distance between major towns and Shimla:

 Kalka: 90 km
 Chandigarh: 110 km
 Ambala: 148 km
 Patiala: 172 km
 Bathinda: 330 km
 Amritsar: 301 km
 Panipat: 275 km
 Delhi: 343 km
 Dehradun: 224 km
 Jammu: 482 km
 Agra: 568 km
 Jaipur: 629 km
 Haridwar: 278 km
 Srinagar: 787 km
 Pithoragarh: 703 km
 Indore: 1170 km
 Kolkata: 1460 km
 Mumbai: 1742 km

Air

Shimla Airport is situated at Jubbarhatti,  from the city. Regular flights to Delhi operate from the airport. The nearest major airport is Chandigarh Airport in Chandigarh about 116 km away.

Rail

The scenic Kalka Shimla Railway, a narrow gauge track, is listed in the Guinness Book of Records for the steepest rise in altitude in a distance of 96 km. Kalka, the plains rail terminus, has daily departures to major Indian cities. The city has a total of three railway stations with Shimla the main station and two others located at Summer Hill and Totu (Jutogh) respectively. It was built to connect Shimla, the summer capital of India during the British Raj, with the Indian rail system.

In 2007, the government of Himachal Pradesh declared the railway a heritage property. For about a week starting on 11 September 2007, an expert team from UNESCO visited the railway to review and inspect it for possible selection as a World Heritage Site. On 8 July 2008, the Kalka–Shimla Railway was listed as a World Heritage Site, alongside Darjeeling Himalayan Railway, Nilgiri Mountain Railway, and Chhatrapati Shivaji Terminus.

Media and communications
State-owned All India Radio and Reliance Broadcast owned 95.0 BIG FM have local radio stations in Shimla, which transmit various programmes of mass interest. Apart from a wide range of other national and international TV channels of different languages, the national TV broadcaster Doordarshan also broadcast channels like DD Shimla, DD National and DD Sports in the city. There are several private FM radio channels like 95.0 BIG FM and Radio Mirchi.

Amar Ujala, Punjab Kesari, and Dainik Bhaskar are the widely circulated Hindi dailies while The Tribune, The Times of India, Hindustan Times and Indian Express are popular English newspapers in the city. Other notable newspapers are Devbhumi Mirror and Divya Himachal. ShimlaNow and Himachal Abhi Abhi, We Are Himachali are the online news portals published from Shimla.

Notable people

 

 M. S. Banga, businessman, former CEO, fund manager
 Lady Constance Bulwer-Lytton, writer and activist
 Victor Bulwer-Lytton, politician
 Shahid Javed Burki, Pakistani economist, born during British rule
 Charlie Chauhan, television actress
 Rubina Dilaik, television actress
 Guy Gibson, WWII RAF aviator, VC
 Horatio Boileau Goad, British policeman and former secretary of the municipal corporation of Shimla
 Samuel Boileau Goad, a principal property owner in Shimla
 O.C. Handa, historian
 S.R. Harnot, writer
 Robin Jackman, former England cricket player
 Celina Jaitly, Bollywood actress
 Ursula Jeans, British actress and wife of British actor Roger Livesey
 Shriniwas Joshi, writer and theatre person
 Preneet Kaur, Indian aristocrat of Patiala and Kashmir dynasties, former Minister for External Affairs
 M. M. Kaye, novelist
 Rahat Kazmi, Pakistani television actor
 Anupam Kher, Bollywood actor
 Earl Kitchener, British viceroy
 Ram Kumar, painter
 Thakur Ram Lal, politician
 John Lea, Navy officer
 Ankit Love, leader of the One Love Party, Great Britain
 Elsie Mackay, British actress
 Simranjit Singh Mann, Sikh politician
 Jamila Massey, British actress
 Henry McMahon, British Indian army officer
 Ashish R Mohan, film director
 Raja Dina Nath, Sikh Khalsa Diwan member
 Meghna Pant, author and feminist 
 Mohinder Singh Pujji, WWII RAF and RIAF pilot, DFC
 Asghar Qadir, Pakistani cosmologist
 Javed Ashraf Qazi, former director of ISI
 Sadiq Hussain Qureshi, Governor of Punjab, Pakistan
 Motilal Rajvansh, Bollywood actor
 Priya Rajvansh, actress
 Sheila Ramani, Miss Shimla
 Hanif Ramay, former Chief Minister of Punjab
 Shafqat Rana, Pakistani test cricketer
 Bruce Seton, British soldier and actor
 Idries Shah, writer on Sufism
 Anand Sharma, Former Union Minister and MP, Rajya Sabha
 Anwar Shemza, Kashmiri writer and radio broadcaster
 Chetan Singh, historian
 Mian Goverdhan Singh, writer and librarian
 Pratibha Singh, politician
 Shakti Singh, Bollywood actor
 Asmita Sood, television actress
 Salman Taseer, Pakistani businessman
 Dhan Singh Thapa, Indian army officer
 Nirmal Verma, Hindi writer
 Sushma Verma, Indian cricketer
 Preity Zinta, Bollywood actress

Sister cities
Sister relationships with towns and regions worldwide include:
 Carbondale, Illinois, United States

See also
 Simla Agreement between India and Pakistan on 3 July 1972
 Simla Accord (1914) was a treaty between Britain and Tibet signed in 1914 at the end of a convention held in Shimla. Although its legal status is disputed, it is currently the effective boundary between China and India.

References

External links

 Official website of Shimla district
 Shimla – Himachal Pradesh Tourism Guide
 Official website of Himachal Tourism
 Municipal Corporation Shimla
 

 
Cities and towns in Shimla district
Former capital cities in India
1819 establishments in India
Populated places established in 1819